The 2022–23 South Carolina Gamecocks men's basketball team represented the University of South Carolina during the 2022–23 NCAA Division I men's basketball season. The team was led by first-year head coach Lamont Paris, and played their home games at Colonial Life Arena in Columbia, South Carolina as a member of the Southeastern Conference.

Previous season
The Gamecocks finished the 2021–22 season 18–13, 9–9 in SEC play to finish in a five-way tie for fifth place. As the No. 7 seed in the SEC tournament, they lost to Mississippi State in the second round.

On March 14, 2022, the school fire head coach Frank Martin. On March 24, the school named Chattanooga head coach Lamont Paris the team's new head coach.

Offseason

Departures

Incoming Transfers

2022 Recruiting class

2023 Recruiting class

Roster

Schedule and results

|-
!colspan=12 style=""| Exhibition

|-
!colspan=12 style=""| Non-conference regular season

|-
!colspan=12 style=""| SEC regular season

|-
!colspan=12 style=""| SEC tournament

See also
2022–23 South Carolina Gamecocks women's basketball team

References

South Carolina Gamecocks
South Carolina Gamecocks men's basketball seasons
South Carolina Gamecocks
South Carolina Gamecocks